is a light gun shooter video game developed and published by Nintendo. It was released for the Family Computer in 1984 and then the arcade Nintendo VS. System and Nintendo Entertainment System in 1985. It was one of the first hit video games to use a light gun as an input device, along with Nintendo's Duck Hunt (1984). The game presents players with "cardboard cut-outs" of gangsters and innocent civilians. The player must shoot the gangs and spare the innocent people. It was a major arcade hit in the United States and Europe.

In real life, Hogan's Alley was a shooting range on the grounds of the Special Police School at Camp Perry, a training facility for the National Guard of the United States.

Gameplay

The game begins with three cardboard cutouts moving into position against a blank wall and turning to face the player. The cutouts display a mixture of gangsters and innocent/friendly people; the player must react quickly and shoot only the gangsters. In later rounds, the backdrop changes from the blank wall to a city block, with some cutouts already exposed as they emerge into view. The player is confronted with five cutouts in each of these latter rounds.

After five rounds apiece in the wall and city block, a bonus round is played. Here, the player has a limited supply of ammunition with which to shoot up to ten tin cans thrown from one side of the screen, trying to bounce them onto ledges at the opposite side for points. After this round, the player returns to the wall rounds and the game continues at an increased speed.

Shooting an innocent person, or failing to shoot a gangster, costs the player one life. No lives can be lost in the bonus round. When all lives are lost, the game is over.

Release
The game is available on the Nintendo Entertainment System and as a Nintendo VS. System Game Pak, which was installed into VS. System Arcade cabinets.

In the United States, Hogan's Alley was released for the Nintendo Entertainment System in 1985 as one of the original 17 launch titles for the system. There are three modes: "Hogan's Alley A" (the blank wall), "Hogan's Alley B" (the town), and "Trick Shot" (shooting soda cans to bounce them onto ledges).

Ports
Hogan's Alley was released for the Wii U Virtual Console on January 7, 2016 in North America.

Reception
In North America, the Nintendo Vs. System version of Hogan's Alley became popular in arcades and popularized light gun video games along with Duck Hunt in 1985. In the United States, Hogan's Alley had topped the RePlay arcade charts by November 1985 In Europe, it had also become a very popular arcade game by 1986.

Computer and Video Games magazine gave the arcade version a generally positive review, calling it "a pleasant change" from the space shooters popular in arcades at the time, but noted the gameplay is similar to Sega's Bank Panic which released the same year and that it may not appeal to everyone. Mike Roberts and Eric Doyle of Computer Gamer magazine gave the arcade game a positive review, praising the realistic gun controller. Computer Gaming World named Hogan's Alley as 1988's Best Target Game for the Nintendo Entertainment System, calling it "an entertaining variation on the theme".

Legacy
Digital artist Cory Arcangel hacked the Hogan's Alley game to produce "I Shot Andy Warhol," an art piece that replaces the game's targets with images of Andy Warhol.  This a reference to the attempt to attack the artist by Valerie Solanas.

Hogan's Alley inspired games appear in WarioWare: Touched! and other games in the WarioWare series. In Super Smash Bros. for Nintendo 3DS and Wii U and Super Smash Bros. Ultimate, the Duck Hunt character has the ability to kick the can from the bonus rounds of Hogan's Alley, which can be continually bounced forward by an off-screen shooter using the NES Zapper until it eventually explodes. The character's Final Smash attack causes opponents to get caught in the middle of a shootout between the enemies from Hogan's Alley and Wild Gunman.

See also
Bank Panic

Notes

References

External links

Hogan's Alley at NinDB

Light gun games
Arcade video games
Nintendo Entertainment System games
Intelligent Systems games
1984 video games
Nintendo arcade games
Nintendo games
Nintendo Research & Development 1 games
Nintendo Vs. Series games
Video games about police officers
Video games developed in Japan
Video games designed by Shigeru Miyamoto
Video games directed by Shigeru Miyamoto
Video games scored by Hirokazu Tanaka
Virtual Console games
Virtual Console games for Wii U